Odelia Sika-Ntiamoah Boampong (born 1981) is a Ghanaian entrepreneur, TV and radio news reporter. She covered the Togolese elections in 2015 and has covered all UNFCCC conferences since 2009. She is also a documentary film maker (World Bank, IFDC, Ministry of Education, Ministry of Environment, Ministry of Energy) and presenter, Africa news (Euro news) correspondent Ghana, news anchor and reporter TV3 news. Twice a Ghana Journalist Award winner, she has also won the minister's award in environmental reporting. She trained at the DW Akademie and was nominated by the US embassy in Ghana for the IVLP programme training in investigative journalism. She is also a board member of the institutional review board for the Center for Scientific and Industrial Research (CSIR Ghana). Passionate about people breaking out of poverty and empowering women economically, she has created the ONfoundation for this purpose. She runs several businesses with her husband, Prince Sika-Ntiamoah Boampong, under the SNB group. She was recently invited by the World Bank as one of 20 young entrepreneurs who can help change growing youth unemployment on the continent. She is a Christian (Ordained Pastor of Victory Bible Church International) and a mother to Ayeyi Sika-Ntiamoah Boampong.

Early life

Odelia was born in Tema, Ghana, to Benjamin Kwabena Ofori, a teacher who raised her as a single parent.

Education

She holds a master's degree in Oil and Gas Communication from the University of Cape Coast and a Bachelor of Arts degree in geography from the University of Ghana.

Career

Odelia had a seven-year working experience in radio, part as a student Journalists with Radio Universe at the University of Ghana and Citi FM, an Accra-based radio station. She worked with Tv3 Network, a leading private TV station in Ghana, also for seven years. At Tv3, she hosted Mission Ghana, a social news programme that focused on lapses in the health and educational sector in Ghana. Euronews (Africa News) Correspondent for Ghana, Odelia is into television content provision, host of Health Plus One, a private health programme, Social Connect a social project by entrepreneurs who want to give back to society by training young girls and Business Trends Africa.

References

External links
 Odelia Ntiamoah Boampong at Facebook.
 Odelia africanews. Twitter.
 Odelia Ofori at YouTube.
 "UN Women Singapore and MasterCard Unveil Ghanaian among 10 Finalists for Project Inspire: 5 Minutes to Change the World", Green Ghana Volunteers, 3 August 2011.

1981 births
Living people
People from Tema
Ghanaian journalists
University of Ghana alumni
University of Cape Coast alumni
Ghanaian women journalists